Micromonospora vulcania is a bacterium from the genus Micromonospora which has been isolated from volcanic sediments in Tonghua, China.

References

External links
Type strain of Micromonospora vulcania at BacDive -  the Bacterial Diversity Metadatabase

Micromonosporaceae
Bacteria described in 2016